Muddem Guda is a village and panchayat in Ranga Reddy District, Telangana, India. It falls under Shabad mandal (administrative division). Near the town there is a Lord Shiva temple and some associated monuments.

References

Villages in Ranga Reddy district